Mickey's Follies is a Mickey Mouse short animated film first released on August 28, 1929, as part of the Mickey Mouse film series. It was directed by Ub Iwerks and Wilfred Jackson, with music by Carl Stalling. It was produced in black and white by The Walt Disney Studio and released to theaters by Celebrity Productions. It was the tenth Mickey Mouse short to be produced, the seventh of that year.

This cartoon is the first in which Mickey sings, and the song -- "Minnie's Yoo-Hoo"—was used as the opening theme for all of the Mickey Mouse cartoons from The Jazz Fool (1929) to Mickey's Steam Roller (1934). Mickey's singing voice is provided by an unknown studio employee; in these early days, Walt Disney was not yet the exclusive voice for Mickey.

Plot
The animals in the barnyard are watching a series of short song and dance numbers performed by other barnyard animals, similar to the Ziegfeld Follies of the day. It opens with Mickey playing the piano with other animals. A series of other short song and dance numbers presume. The cartoon ends with Mickey giving a solo performance of his theme song.

Along with Mickey, Minnie Mouse is shown in the audience cheering for Mickey. There is also a cast of other barnyard animals, including a group of dancing ducks, a chicken-rooster duo who beat each other up in sync to the music, an operatic singing pig who is poorly received, and various other barnyard animals in the audience.

Voice cast
 Mickey Mouse: Walt Disney
 Minnie Mouse: Marcellite Garner
 Patricia Pigg: Eleanor Fouts

Reception
In Mickey's Movies: The Theatrical Films of Mickey Mouse, Gijs Grob writes: "Mickey's Follies is Disney's second serious attempt at lip synch, after The Karnival Kid. Mickey sings much more than in the former cartoon, and the all-too-literal mouth movements give him many awkward facial expressions. Later, the animators would learn to tone down the mouth movements, keeping Mickey's face more consistent without losing the illusion of speech."

Motion Picture News (September 14, 1929): "Walt Disney's creation, the popular Mickey Mouse, sings and dances in a typical barnyard frolic, which is the tenth of the series of Mickey films. Strictly speaking, it is not as good as some of its predecessors, but it certainly contains plenty of laughs, nevertheless. One of the weak spots in the film is the injection of a theme song sung by Mickey Mouse; it seems rather flat. Another thing to notice was the cartoon work, which was not executed with the nicety that some of the other cartoons have. However, the laugh material far outburdens the few shortcomings. The animals have a grand time and the fun is shared by the audience. Some of the barnyard folk are sitting on an outhouse, and in their ecstacy over Mickey's performance they crash in the roof. Immediately the door opens and a pig runs out with his pants down. Can you imagine? Movie audiences relish this sort of screen fun, and Mickey's Follies is supplied with enough laughs to make them gurge heartily and long."

Home media
The short was released on December 2, 2002 on Walt Disney Treasures: Mickey Mouse in Black and White.

See also
Mickey Mouse (film series)

References

External links
 
 
 

1920s Disney animated short films
1929 short films
1929 animated films
1929 comedy films
American black-and-white films
Films directed by Ub Iwerks
Films directed by Wilfred Jackson
Films produced by Walt Disney
Mickey Mouse short films
Films scored by Carl Stalling
Cockfighting in film
American animated short films
1920s English-language films
1920s American films